News of the World was a British tabloid newspaper. It may also refer to:

Arts and entertainment
News of the World (album), an album by Queen, 1977
News of the World Tour, a tour by Queen
News of the World (novel), a 2016 novel by Paulette Jiles
News of the World (film), a 2020 film based on the novel by Paulette Jiles
"News of the World" (song), a song by The Jam, 1978
"News of the World", a song by the Wildhearts from Earth vs the Wildhearts, 1993

Sports
News of the World Match Play, a golf tournament
News of the World Snooker Tournament, a snooker tournament
News of the World Darts Championship, a darts competition
1964 News of the World Trophy, a motor race